Diocese of Sarajevo may refer to:

 Serbian Orthodox Diocese of Sarajevo, former common name of the current Serbian Orthodox Metropolitanate of Dabar-Bosna, when its seat was in the city of Sarajevo
 Roman Catholic Diocese of Sarajevo, common name of the Roman Catholic Archdiocese of Sarajevo

See also
Sarajevo
Catholic Church in Bosnia and Herzegovina
Eastern Orthodoxy in Bosnia and Herzegovina
Diocese of Banja Luka (disambiguation)
Diocese of Trebinje (disambiguation)
Diocese of Mostar (disambiguation)